Brocchinia  is a genus of sea snails, marine gastropod mollusks in the family Cancellariidae, the nutmeg snails.

Species
According to the World Register of Marine Species (WoRMS) the following species with a valid name are included within the genus Brocchinia :
 † Brocchinia anomala (P. Marshall & Murdoch, 1920) 
  Brocchinia azorica (Bouchet & Warén, 1985)
 † Brocchinia bicarinata (Hoernes & Auinger, 1890) 
 Brocchinia canariensis Rolán & Hernández, 2009
 Brocchinia clenchi Petit, 1986
 † Brocchinia culminata (Beu, 1970) 
 Brocchinia decapensis (Barnard, 1960)
 Brocchinia exigua (E.A. Smith, 1891)
 † Brocchinia explicata (Laws, 1935) 
 † Brocchinia finlayi (Marwick, 1931) 
 Brocchinia fischeri (A. Adams, 1860)
 Brocchinia harasewychi de Barros & de Lima, 2007
 Brocchinia kaiensis Verhecken, 1997
 † Brocchinia lamellifera P. A. Maxwell, 1992 
 † Brocchinia lestellensis Lozouet, 1999 
 Brocchinia nodosa (Verrill & S. Smith, 1885)
 † Brocchinia nucleosa (Marwick, 1931) 
 † Brocchinia petiti P. A. Maxwell, 1992 
 Brocchinia pustulosa Verhecken, 1991
 Brocchinia septentrionalis (Finlay, 1930)
 † Brocchinia serrata (Laws, 1935) 
 Brocchinia tanimbarensis Verhecken, 1997
 † Brocchinia tauroparva (Sacco, 1894) 
 † Brocchinia tuberculifera (Laws, 1935) 
 Brocchinia verheckeni de Barros & de Lima, 2007
Species brought into synonymy 
 Brocchinia cornidei (Altimira, 1978) : synonym of Admetula cornidei (Altimira, 1978)
 Brocchinia pusilla (H. Adams, 1869) : synonym of Brocchinia clenchi Petit, 1986

References

 Jousseaume F.P. (1887). La famille Cancellariidae (Mollusques Gastéropodes). Le Naturaliste. ser. 2, 9(19): 155-157, 192-194, 213-214, 221-223
 Verhecken A. (1997) Mollusca Gastropoda: Arafura Sea Cancellariidae collected during the Karubar cruise. In: A. Crosnier & P. Bouchet (eds), Résultats des campagnes Musorstom, volume 16. Mémoires du Muséum National d'Histoire Naturelle 172: 295-323. page(s): 300
 Petit, R.E. & Harasewych, M.G. (2005) Catalogue of the superfamily Cancellarioidea Forbes and Hanley, 1851 (Gastropoda: Prosobranchia)- 2nd edition. Zootaxa, 1102, 3-161. NIZT 682
 Hemmen J. (2007). Recent Cancellariidae. Wiesbaden, 428pp

External links
 Sacco, F. (1894). I molluschi dei terreni terziarii del Piemonte e della Liguria. Parte XVI. (Cancellariidae). Carlo Clausen, Torino, 82 pp., 3 pl.Carlo Clausen, Torino 
 Finlay, H. J. (1930). Additions to the Recent fauna of New Zealand. No. 3. Transactions of the New Zealand Institute. 61: 222-247

Cancellariidae
Gastropod genera
Gastropods described in 1887
Taxa named by Félix Pierre Jousseaume